San Antonio de Chuca District is one of twenty districts of the province Caylloma in Peru.

Geography 
Other mountains are listed below:

Ethnic groups 
The people in the district are mainly indigenous citizens of Quechua descent. Quechua is the language which the majority of the population (72.68%) learnt to speak in childhood, 26.19% of the residents started speaking using the Spanish language (2007 Peru Census).

References

Districts of the Caylloma Province
Districts of the Arequipa Region